Le Cheval Blanc is a brewpub located on rue Ontario in Montreal, Quebec, Canada. In 1986, it became the first licensed brewpub in Montreal.

Some of its craft beers available on tap being quite popular, in 1987 the establishment started a microbrewery of its own: La Brasserie Le Cheval Blanc, which is also said to be the city's first. In 1998, it merged with two other microbreweries Les Brasseurs GMT and Les Brasseurs de l'Anse to form Les Brasseurs RJ.

 The Cheval's bottled beers most commonly available in Quebec's dépanneurs are:
 La Blanche Cheval Blanc, traditional Belgian white, 5%
 Coup de grisou, buckwheat amber ale, spiced with coriander, refermented, 5%

In 1999, the tavern was renovated and is now also a music venue and an art gallery.

See also 
Quebec beer
Canadian beer

References

External links 
 Le Cheval Blanc Web site

Beer brewing companies based in Quebec
Manufacturing companies based in Montreal
Restaurants in Montreal
Centre-Sud